Dipayan Chakraborty is an Indian politician. He is a member of Bharatiya Janata Party. He was elected to the Assam Legislative Assembly from Silchar constituency in the 2021 Assam Legislative Assembly election.

References

Assam politicians
Living people
Bharatiya Janata Party politicians from Assam
Assam MLAs 2021–2026
Year of birth missing (living people)
People from Cachar district